Zahlé  District is an administrative district of the Beqaa Governorate of the Republic of Lebanon. Its capital and largest town is the town of the same name. A reed-roofed town set among the eastern foothills of Mount Sannine. Zahle was founded about 300 years ago in an area whose past reaches back some five millennia.

Main cities and towns
Ali an Nahri
Anjar
Barelias
Jdita
Majdal Anjar
Qabb Ilyas
Rayak
Saadnayel
Taalabaya
Zahlé
Qâa er Rîm

Demographics
The Zahlé district is one of the most diverse regions in Lebanon. Roughly 55% of the population is of the Christian religion, with a decent portion being Greek Catholic. The remaining 45% of the population is of the Muslim religion, which the majority belongs to the Sunni and a minority of Shiite denominations. The area is also home to a modest Armenian Orthodox and Catholic population, who have historically resided near the Anjar area of the district.

Other settlements
Ablah
Ain Kfar Zabad
Bouarij
Chtaura
Dalhamiye
Deir el Ghazal
Ferzol
Haoush el Ghanam
Haoush Hala
Hay el Fikani
Kfar Zabad

Masa
Mreijat
Nabi Ayla
Nasriyet Rizk
Niha Bekaa
Qousaya
Raait
Taanayel
Tal Amara

See also
2011 Estonian cyclists abduction

References

  

 
Districts of Lebanon